Ceiupaba lineata is a species of beetle in the family Cerambycidae, and the only species in the genus Ceiupaba. It was described by Martins and Galileo in 1998.

References

Desmiphorini
Beetles described in 1998
Monotypic Cerambycidae genera